Louise Alexandra "Alix" Stevenson (née Jamieson; born 31 March 1942) is a Scottish retired athlete. She competed for Great Britain in the women's long jump at the 1964 Summer Olympics in Tokyo, Japan.

Career
Trained by the respected coach John Anderson, Jamieson was a national champion in multiple events (as well as a Scotland international in field hockey) and still holds the record for most golds won overall at the Scottish Athletics Championships with 16 claimed over a decade between 1960 and 1970 (two in the 100-yard dash, three in the 80 metres hurdles, seven in the long jump and four in the pentathlon). At British level, she claimed a long jump gold medal in 1964 at the AAA Indoor Championships and a pentathlon bronze at the 1966 AAA Championships.

On a wider platform, she entered three events at the 1958 Commonwealth Games (100 yards, 220 yards and high jump, though without great success), again made little impact on the 100 yards event at the 1966 Games however achieved fourth place in the long jump event, then focused solely on the long jump at her 'home' games at Edinburgh in 1970, but finished in fourth just outside the medals once more. At the 1964 Olympics, she qualified for the final group with the exact distance required – 6.00m –  but was unable to match or better this score in the final; British teammate Mary Rand won the gold medal and recorded a world record jump (6.76m) in the competition.

Personal life
Jamieson attended Hutcheson's Grammar School in Glasgow, and during her time there was awarded the nationwide 'Frances Barker Shield' for outstanding performance on three occasions. In 2009, the school's new multi-sport facility was named the Alix Jamieson Stadium in recognition of her achievements.

She is one of several talented sportspeople in her family: her father Andrew was a golfer who won the Scottish Amateur championship, represented Scotland and Great Britain (Walker Cup) in team play and briefly achieved fame when he unexpectedly beat Bobby Jones, one of the leading talents of the era; her younger sister Jinty was also an athlete who competed alongside her in the 1970 Commonwealth Games; her second cousin Jean Westwood was a multiple World champion in ice dancing; and her husband David Stevenson was a fellow competitor in the 1964 Olympics in the pole vault event. As the operators of a successful textile business (Edinburgh Woollen Mill), together they owned several racehorses, with Gordon W. Richards as trainer.

References

1942 births
Living people
People educated at Hutchesons' Grammar School
Athletes (track and field) at the 1964 Summer Olympics
Athletes (track and field) at the 1966 British Empire and Commonwealth Games
Scottish female field hockey players 
Scottish female long jumpers
Scottish female sprinters
Olympic athletes of Great Britain
Commonwealth Games competitors for Scotland 
Athletes (track and field) at the 1958 British Empire and Commonwealth Games
Athletes (track and field) at the 1970 British Commonwealth Games
Sportspeople from Glasgow
20th-century Scottish women
21st-century Scottish women